Brayshaw is a surname of English origin. The name refers to:

Edward Brayshaw (1933–1990), British actor
Ian Brayshaw (b. 1942), Australian cricket player and Australian rules football player
James Brayshaw (b. 1967), Australian cricket player and television sports announcer
Mark Brayshaw (b. 1966), Australian rules football player 
Russ Brayshaw (1918–1996), Canadian professional ice hockey player
Teddy Brayshaw (1863–1908), English international footballer